2120 South Michigan Ave. is the fifteenth studio album by George Thorogood and the Destroyers.  It was released on June 14, 2011 on the Capitol Records label.  The album peaked at #2 on the Billboard Top Blues Albums chart.  The title refers to the address of the offices and recording studios of Chess Records in Chicago.  The album contains ten covers of songs recorded on Chess Records by artists such as Chuck Berry, Bo Diddley, Willie Dixon, and Muddy Waters; plus a cover of The Rolling Stones' instrumental "2120 South Michigan Avenue" and two original songs about Chess Records artists.  Capitol Records approached Thorogood with the idea for the album and selected most of the songs.  Buddy Guy and Charlie Musselwhite perform on the album, although their work was added after primary recording was complete.

Track listing

Personnel

Delaware Destroyers
George Thorogood – lead guitar, rhythm guitar and slide guitar, vocals
Bill Blough – bass
Buddy Leach – saxophones
Jeff Simon – drums
Jim Suhler – rhythm and lead guitar

Additional musicians
Buddy Guy – lead guitar (track 2)
Tom Hambridge – drums, percussion, background vocals
Tommy MacDonald – bass
Kevin McKendree – piano, Hammond B3 organ
Charlie Musselwhite – harmonica (tracks 10, 13)
Marla Thorogood – background vocals
Rio Thorogood – background vocals

Technical
Tom Hambridge – producer
Mike Donahue – executive producer
Harry Gale – engineer
Mike Tholen – engineer
Shawn Berman – engineer
Susan Lavoie – art direction
Mark Holley – design
Brian To – photography

References

George Thorogood and the Destroyers albums
2011 albums
Capitol Records albums
Albums produced by Tom Hambridge
Covers albums
Boogie rock albums